Kia Forte was a women's volleyball club team in the Shakey's V-League. The club was owned by the Columbian Autocar Corporation, the exclusive distributor of Kia Motors vehicles in the Philippines.

It was the second sports franchise of Columbian Autocar Corporation, next to its PBA basketball team.

Roster
For the Shakey's V-League 12th Season Reinforced Open Conference:

Coaching staff
 Head Coach: Oliver Almadro
 Assistant Coach(s): Mario Mia, Jr.

Team Staff
 Team Manager:
 Team Utility: 

Medical Staff
 Team Physician:
 Physical Therapist:

Honors and awards

Shakey's V-League

Team

Individual

See also
Mahindra Enforcer (formerly Kia Carnival & Kia Sorento)

References

Women's volleyball teams in the Philippines
Shakey's V-League
2015 establishments in the Philippines
Volleyball clubs established in 2015